The 2017–18 season was SK Slavia Prague's 25th season in the Czech First League. The team was competing in Czech First League, the Czech Cup, and the UEFA Champions League.

The season was Jaroslav Šilhavý's second in charge of the club after signing from FK Dukla Prague in the autumn of 2016. He was replaced by Jindřich Trpišovský in December 2017.

Season Events

On 14 May, Slavia gathered three points against Dukla Prague (match-week 28), which was sufficient to be mathematically assured that the team will finish ahead of Sparta in the league table.

Squad

Out on loan

Transfers

In

Loans in

Out

Loans out

Released

Pre-season and friendlies

Competitions

Overall record

Czech First League

League table

Results summary

Results by round

Matches

Czech Cup

UEFA Champions League

Qualifying rounds

Third qualifying round

Play-off round

UEFA Europa League

Group stage

Squad statistics

Appearances and goals

|-
|colspan="14"|Players away from Slavia Prague on loan:

|-
|colspan="14"|Players who left Slavia Prague during the season:

|}

Goal scorers

Disciplinary record

References

External links
Official website

Slavia Prague
SK Slavia Prague seasons
Slavia Prague